Bourama Mariko (born November 29, 1979) is a Malian judoka.

Achievements

References

External links 
 

1979 births
Living people
Malian male judoka
Judoka at the 2004 Summer Olympics
Olympic judoka of Mali
21st-century Malian people
African Games medalists in judo
Competitors at the 1999 All-Africa Games
African Games bronze medalists for Mali